A policy of deliberate ambiguity (also known as a policy of strategic ambiguity, strategic uncertainty) is the practice by a government of being intentionally ambiguous on certain aspects of its foreign policy. It may be useful if the country has contrary foreign and domestic policy goals or if it wants to take advantage of risk aversion to abet a deterrence strategy.  Such a policy can be very risky as it may cause misinterpretation of the intentions of a state, leading to actions that contradict that state's wishes.

China 
There is deliberate ambiguity regarding the government of the country of 'China' (as well as what land this country constitutes).  Currently, two governments claim legitimate rule and sovereignty over all of China, which they claim includes Mainland China, Hong Kong, Macau and Taiwan, as well as some other islands. The People's Republic of China (PRC) rules Mainland China under a one-party system and Hong Kong and Macau as special administrative regions, while the Republic of China (ROC) governs the Island of Taiwan as well as the Kinmen Islands, the Pescadores Islands and the Matsu Islands, formerly under a one-party system which the ROC collectively refers to as the "Free area of the Republic of China". Similar circumstances existed until 1949 as the Nationalist government controlled most parts of the country while the Communist rebels held on parts of China, particularly in the north and Jiangxi where the Chinese Soviet Republic was declared. Other proto-states such as Fujian, Tibet, and Outer Mongolia were not under the central government's control. For further background, see Two Chinas, One China and Cross-Strait relations.

Owing to the controversial political status of Taiwan and the People's Republic of China's One China principle, foreign governments have felt a need to be ambiguous regarding Taiwan. The PRC pressures states to recognize it as the sole legitimate representative of China, with which most states comply. In practice, however, most states maintain different levels of ambiguity on their attitudes to the Taiwan issue: see Foreign relations of the People's Republic of China and Foreign relations of the Republic of China.

Starting with the 1979 Nagoya Resolution and the following 1981 agreement with the International Olympic Committee, those from Taiwan who attend the Olympic Games and other various international organizations and events participate under the deliberately ambiguous name of "Chinese Taipei".

Iraq 
Saddam Hussein employed a policy of intentional ambiguity about whether Iraq had weapons of mass destruction prior to the 2003 Invasion of Iraq.  He persisted in a “cat and mouse” game with U.N. inspectors to try to avoid violation of United Nations Security Council Resolution 687, while at the same time trying to ensure that the population and its neighbors (specifically Iran) still believed that Iraq may have weapons of mass destruction.

Israel 
Israel is deliberately ambiguous as to whether or not it possesses nuclear weapons, which its commentators term "nuclear ambiguity" or "nuclear opacity". Most analysts agree that Israel is in possession of nuclear weapons.

Israel also practices deliberate ambiguity over the issue of targeted killings and airstrikes. Prior to 2017, Israel almost never confirmed or denied whether Israel was involved in the deaths of suspected terrorists on foreign soil. However, with the onset of the Syrian Civil War (and Israel's involvement against Iran and Hezbollah), exceptions to its policy became more prominent. Israel acknowledged its intervention in missile strikes in  military role in the war has been limited to missile strikes, which until 2017 were not officially acknowledged. Israel has made rare exceptions to this policy to deny involvement in certain killings in the Syrian Civil War.

Russia 
In early April 2015, an editorial in the British newspaper The Times, with a reference to semi-official sources within the Russian military and intelligence establishment, opined that Russia's warnings of its alleged preparedness for a nuclear response to certain non-nuclear acts on the part of NATO, were to be construed as "an attempt to create strategic uncertainty" to undermine Western concerted security policy.

United Kingdom 
The United Kingdom is deliberately ambiguous about whether its ballistic missile submarines would carry out a nuclear counter-attack in the event that the government were destroyed by a nuclear first strike.  Upon taking office, the incoming prime minister issues sealed letters of last resort to the commanders of the submarines on what action to take in such circumstances.

United States 
The United States has historically and presently has a policy of strategic ambiguity on several issues.

Taiwan 
The oldest and longest running of the United States' deliberately ambiguous policies was whether and how it would defend the Republic of China on Taiwan in the event of an attack by the People's Republic of China (Mainland China).  This issue is at the cornerstone of United States–Taiwan relations and a central sticking point in United States–China relations. This policy was intended to discourage both a unilateral declaration of independence by ROC leaders and an invasion of Taiwan by the PRC. The United States seemingly abandoned strategic ambiguity in 2001 after then-President George W. Bush stated that he would "do whatever it takes" to defend Taiwan.  He later used more ambiguous language, stating in 2003 that "The United States policy is one China".

In October 2021, President Biden announced a commitment that the United States would defend Taiwan if attacked by the People's Republic of China. But then the White House quickly clarified: "The president was not announcing any change in our policy and there is no change in our policy". In May 2022 Biden again stated that the U.S. would intervene militarily if China invaded Taiwan. Though a White House official again stated that the statement did not indicate a policy shift.

Response to chemical or biological warfare 
Another historic use of this policy is whether the United States would retaliate to a chemical or biological attack with nuclear weapons; specifically, during the Persian Gulf War.  Related is the notion of a nuclear umbrella.  Some commentators believe President Barack Obama broke US policy and damaged U.S. interests by failing to take sufficient action against the regime of Bashar al-Assad for its Ghouta chemical attack on civilians in the village of Ghouta near Damascus on August 21, 2013.  President Barack Obama had used the phrase "red line" in reference to the use of chemical weapons on August 20, just one day prior. Specifically, Obama said: "We have been very clear to the Assad regime, but also to other players on the ground, that a red line for us is we start seeing a whole bunch of chemical weapons moving around or being utilized.  That would change my calculus.  That would change my equation."

Nuclear weapons on surface ships 

Since passing a 1987 law, New Zealand has banned all nuclear powered means of war, whether nuclear weapons or nuclear powered propulsion from its sovereign territory; thereby making it a military nuclear-free zone.  New Zealand has not banned civilian nuclear energy, but it is no longer used there and the public is quite opposed, thereby making it a de facto nuclear-free country.  This ban includes its  territorial waters as per the United Nations Convention on the Law of the Sea.

Official U.S. Navy policy is "not to deploy nuclear weapons aboard surface ships, naval aircraft, attack submarines, or guided missile submarines. However, we do not discuss the presence or absence of nuclear weapons aboard specific ships, submarines, or aircraft.”  Because the U.S. Navy refuses to confirm whether any particular ship is or is not carrying nuclear weapons, this was an effective ban on the ships' entry into New Zealand territory.  In response, the United States partially suspended New Zealand from the ANZUS military alliance.  President Ronald Reagan stated that New Zealand was "a friend, but not an ally".

Nuclear weapons and Israel 
The United States also tolerates Israel's deliberate ambiguity as to whether Israel has nuclear weapons.  Israel is not a signatory to the Treaty on the Non-Proliferation of Nuclear Weapons.  Therefore, by not acknowledging that Israel likely has nuclear weapons, the US avoids having to sanction it for violating American anti-proliferation law.

East and West Germany
After West Germany gave up its "Hallstein Doctrine" of ending diplomatic relations with any country recognizing East Germany (thus implicitly following a "one Germany policy"), West Germany turned to a policy of virtual/de facto recognizing East Germany in the 1970s, despite still maintaining several policies in accordance with the fictive but de jure legal principle of there being only one Germany.

East German citizens were treated as West German citizens upon arrival in West Germany and exports to East Germany were treated as if they were domestic trade. That created a deliberately ambiguous policy that reconciled the demand by the rest of the world for West Germany to acknowledge the existence of East Germany and the desire by the vast majority of West German politicians to avoid recognizing German partition as permanent.

India 
India's Draft Nuclear Doctrine has been put under scrutiny ever since it was updated in January 2003.

See also 
Country neutrality
Double agent
Dual loyalty
Non-Aligned Movement
Flexible response
Glomar response

References

Articles 
.

External links 

Arms Control Association: U.S. Nuclear Policy: "Negative Security Assurances"

International relations
Israeli nuclear development